Catalino Duarte Ortuño (born 23 March 1970) is a Mexican politician affiliated with the PRD. He currently serves as Deputy of the LXII Legislature of the Mexican Congress representing Guerrero and previously served in the Congress of Guerrero.

References

1970 births
Living people
Politicians from Guerrero
Party of the Democratic Revolution politicians
21st-century Mexican politicians
Autonomous University of Guerrero alumni
Members of the Congress of Guerrero
Deputies of the LXII Legislature of Mexico
Members of the Chamber of Deputies (Mexico) for Guerrero